Sean Dougall (born 28 October 1989) is an Irish former rugby union player, and current coach. He played primarily as an openside Flanker but could also play blindside or No.8. Dougall is currently the contact skills coach and assistant strength and conditioning coach at La Rochelle in the French Top 14.

Professional career

Ulster
Dougall joined the Ulster academy in 2008 and was a member for two years.

Rotherham
Dougall left Ulster for English side Rotherham, joining in 2010. He captained Rotherham whenever Sam Dickinson, the usual captain, was unavailable. After signing a deal to join Munster for the 2012–13 season, Dougall played his last game for Rotherham against Bedford Blues on 21 April 2012.

Munster
On 16 March 2012, it was announced that Irish province, and two-time European champions, Munster had signed Dougall on a one-year contract for the 2012–13 season. Speaking ahead of his move to Munster, Dougall talked about the competition for places in the Munster back-row and the opportunity this gives him.

"The chance to train and play with the likes of David Wallace is another great opportunity and will improve aspects of my game as well as hopefully adding attributes that I never had before. To play for a team like Munster has always been an aspiration of mine. With the culture and ethos they have over there I knew it was a fantastic opportunity"

Dougall made his full Munster debut on 1 September 2012, in their opening 2012–13 Pro12 league fixture against Edinburgh. He made his European Rugby Champions Cup debut on 13 October 2012, in Munster's opening fixture away to Racing 92. Dougall also scored his first try for Munster in this game. In January 2013, Dougall agreed a two-year contract extension with Munster. Dougall started in Munster's 24–16 semi-final defeat to Toulon on 27 April 2014.

Pau
On 30 January 2015, it was announced that Dougall would be joining French Rugby Pro D2 side Pau after the 2014–15 season, having decided not to renew his contract with Munster. In May 2017, it was announced that Dougall had signed a two-year contract extension with Pau.

Valence Romans Drôme Rugby
After four seasons at Pau, Dougall joined another French club, Valence Romans Drôme Rugby, who had been promoted from Fédérale 1 to the Rugby Pro D2 for the 2019–20 season.

Stade Rochelais
Upon retiring from playing, Dougall signed with La Rochelle as Strength and Conditioning Assistant Coach for the Professional and Academy teams for the 2021-22 season where Dougall’s former Munster teammate Ronan O'Gara was director of rugby. Stade Rochelais went on to win the European Champions Cup 2021-22. 
In May 2022, Dougall  signed a further two year contract with the La Rochelle as Contact skills conditioning coach for the Professional, Academy and Youth team.

Ireland
Dougall played for Ireland U18 and Ireland U19 and stated a desire to play for Ireland's senior national team. He was selected in the Emerging Ireland squad on 26 May 2014. Dougall started in their second game against Uruguay on 18 June 2014. He also started in the 31–10 win Romania on 22 June 2014, a win that secured the 2014 IRB Nations Cup for Emerging Ireland.

Honours

Emerging Ireland
World Rugby Nations Cup
Winner (1): (2014)

References

External links
Section Paloise Profile
Munster Profile
Ulster Academy Profile
Rotherham Profile

1989 births
Living people
Rugby union players from Perth, Scotland
Irish rugby union players
Irish Exiles rugby union players
Rotherham Titans players
Munster Rugby players
Section Paloise players
Irish expatriate sportspeople in France
Expatriate rugby union players in France
Irish expatriate rugby union players
Rugby union flankers
Rugby union number eights